Life After Beth is a 2014 American zombie comedy film written and directed by Jeff Baena. The film stars Aubrey Plaza, Dane DeHaan, Molly Shannon, Cheryl Hines, Paul Reiser, Matthew Gray Gubler, and John C. Reilly. The film premiered in competition at 2014 Sundance Film Festival on January 19, 2014, and was given a limited release on August 15, 2014. This was Garry Marshall's final film appearance, although he would continue to write films and act in television until his death in 2016.

Plot
Zach Orfman is devastated when his girlfriend, Beth Slocum, dies after being bitten by a venomous snake while hiking. He begins spending time with Beth's parents, Geenie and Maury. Zach confesses to Maury that he and Beth were having problems in their relationship, but Maury advises him not to let this define them.

When the Slocums suddenly stop contacting Zach, he visits their house and sees Beth through a window. Zach yells to be let in but his brother Kyle, a security officer, escorts him off the premises. At home, Zach's insistence that Beth is alive cause his parents to worry. That night, Zach breaks in and discovers that Beth's parents have been hiding her. A heated argument ensues before Zach storms off. Later, he goes to Beth's grave and sees a large hole in its place. He confronts Geenie and Maury, who explain that, after her funeral, Beth suddenly reappeared, seemingly alive and well. Beth's parents are reluctant to let her leave the house during daytime and refuse to tell her that she died. When Zach takes Beth on a daytime date in the park, her face starts to blister. Maury bans Zach from seeing Beth, but Zach continues to sneak in.

Beth grows increasingly violent and begins having severe mood swings. Zach notices other people around town acting similarly, and seemingly physically stronger than when they were alive. Zach goes to a diner where he sees his childhood friend, Erica Wexler, who offers her condolences over Beth. As they leave, Zach accidentally runs Beth over with his car. Several bystanders rush to her aid, but she scares them off by screaming at them. After a violent confrontation with Erica when Beth mistakenly assumes Zach is cheating on her, he brings Beth to her grave and tells her the truth, then tries to break up with her, only for her to angrily drive off in his car. Zach returns home and discovers that his late grandfather has also resurrected.

Maury arrives and implores Zach to tell Beth that he lied about her being dead and promise to stay with her forever, to which Zach reluctantly agrees. Zach drives off with an increasingly distraught Beth, but Maury catches them, knocks Zach unconscious, and takes Beth home. Once Zach wakes, he returns home to find a stranger in the house and burnt bodies in the backyard, which he believes to be his family.

Zach prepares to leave the state, but changes his mind and drives back to the Slocum house. He finds the house in disarray and discovers that Beth, now a full-fledged bloodthirsty zombie, has eaten Maury and bitten off Geenie's hand. Zach allows Geenie to escape and calms Beth by promising to hike with her. They run into Kyle, who is hunting zombies and explains that their parents are still alive and have escaped to a safehouse. Kyle gives Zach his handgun and encourages him to put Beth out of her misery. Zach and Beth stop by a cliff. He tearfully apologizes for never doing the things she wanted when she was still alive. They profess their love to each other before Zach shoots her in the head.

Zach is reunited with his family at the safehouse, along with a traumatized Erica, who was forced to kill her own grandmother. The survivors make plans to leave town, but the power suddenly returns and a TV news report claims things have returned to normal. Some time later, Zach visits Beth and Maury's graves and leaves Beth's scarf on her tombstone, and a chess piece on Maury's. Zach's mom picks him up, along with Erica. Zach invites Erica for dinner and she accepts, smiling as they drive off.

Cast

Production
Jeff Baena conceived of the idea of the film several years prior and it then almost went into development with Joseph Gordon-Levitt in the boyfriend role. The project laid dormant until Aubrey Plaza came across the script and showed interest in playing the lead.

Principal photography took place in Los Angeles between July 8, 2013 and August 6, 2013.

Reception

Critical response
Life After Beth received mixed reviews. Review aggregation website Rotten Tomatoes gave the film a 45% rating, with an average score of 5.4/10 based on 96 reviews. The site's consensus states, "In spite of Aubrey Plaza's committed performance, Life After Beth remains a sketch-worthy idea that's been uncomfortably stretched to feature length." On Metacritic, which assigns a normalized rating out of 100 based on reviews from critics, the film has a score of 50 out of 100 based on 30 reviews, indicating "mixed or average" reviews.

In a positive review, critic Mark Kermode wrote, "Sensibly prioritising straight-faced weirdness over goofy gags, writer/director Baena keeps things just the right side of believable, eschewing explanation in favour of cracked domesticity. John C Reilly and Molly Shannon are terrific as Beth’s gaily traumatised parents, but Plaza steals the show with one foot in the grave, her rotting heroine ricocheting between adolescent snarkiness and cadaverous rage, a lethal combination of which no one around her has the measure." Richard Corliss of Time also gave a positive review, writing, "Plaza, whose wide-eyed stare suggests a zombie as painted by Margaret Keane, plausibly navigates Beth's journey into full-throttle Linda Blair demonic dementia."

In a more critical review, Brian Eggert of Deep Focus Review wrote, "Of course, in the long tradition of zombie metaphors, the whole movie stands as an allegory for dealing with the heartache of loss, be it the loss of life, or simply a bad breakup where the other party seems to become a raging monster afterward. Though not without its fair share of charms and laughs, the central notion of zombie physical romance is handled in an unbelievable way. Then again, perhaps 'unbelievable' is a poor argument against a movie where the dead return to life."

References

External links
Life After Beth at AllMovie

 
 
 

2014 films
2014 comedy horror films
2014 directorial debut films
2014 independent films
2014 romantic comedy films
2010s American films
2010s English-language films
A24 (company) films
American comedy horror films
American independent films
American romantic comedy films
American romantic horror films
American Zoetrope films
American zombie comedy films
Films directed by Jeff Baena
Films set in 2014
Films set in Los Angeles
Films shot in Los Angeles
Human-zombie romance in fiction
Resurrection in film